Hong In-gi (born 22 April 1961) is a South Korean alpine skier. He competed in three events at the 1980 Winter Olympics.

References

1961 births
Living people
South Korean male alpine skiers
Olympic alpine skiers of South Korea
Alpine skiers at the 1980 Winter Olympics
Place of birth missing (living people)
20th-century South Korean people